The 12561 / 12562 Swatantrata Senani Superfast Express is a Superfast Express train belonging to Indian Railways that runs between  and  in India. It operates as train number 12561 from Jaynagar to New Delhi and as train number 12562 in the reverse direction. It services the states of Delhi, Uttar Pradesh and Bihar. It reverses direction at Samastipur Junction.

Coaches

Since September 2017 the 12561/12562 Swatantra Senani Superfast Express with new LHB coach has 1 AC hot buffet car, 2 AC 1st Class cum AC 2 tier, 1 AC 2 tier, 2 AC 3 tier, 11 Sleeper class and 3 General Unreserved coaches, and 2 power generator cars.

As with most train services in India, coach composition may be amended at the discretion of Indian Railways depending on demand.

Service

The 12561 Swatantra Senani Superfast Express covers a distance of 1234 kilometers in 21 hours 8 mins (134.30 km/hr) and 21 hours 12 mins as 12562 Swatantra Senani Superfast Express (124.24 km/hr).

As the average speed of the train is above 
And the average delay is of 6hrs and 30 mins, as per Indian Railway rules, its fare includes a Superfast surcharge.

Schedule

Route & halts

Direction reversal

 SPJ –

Traction

As the route is fully electrified, it runs with Kanpur /  Gomoh-based WAP-7 (HOG)-equipped locomotive from end to end.

Gallery

Timetable

 12561 Swatantrata Senani Superfast Express leaves Jaynagar every day at 17:20 hrs IST and reaches New Delhi at 15:40 hrs IST the next day.
 12562 Swatantrata Senani Superfast Express leaves New Delhi every day at 21:15hrs IST and reaches Jaynagar at 19:23 hrs IST the next day.

References 

Transport in Delhi
Transport in Darbhanga
Rail transport in Bihar
Rail transport in Uttar Pradesh
Rail transport in Delhi
Express trains in India
Named passenger trains of India